The women's long jump at the 2012 IAAF World Indoor Championships will be held at the Ataköy Athletics Arena on 10 and 11 March.

Medalists

Records

Qualification standards

Schedule

Results

Qualification

Qualification standard: 6.75 m (Q) or at least best 8 qualified (q). 19 athletes from 15 countries participated.  The qualification round started at 09:37 and ended at 11:46.

Final

8 athletes from 6 countries participated.  The final started at 14:05 and ended at 15:15.

References

Long Jump
Long jump at the World Athletics Indoor Championships
2012 in women's athletics